Lago di Ortiglieto is a reservoir in northwest Italy which straddles the Metropolitan City of Genoa in Liguria, and the Province of Alessandria in Piedmont.

History 
Lago di Ortiglieto reservoir was firstly designed in 1906 by ing. Zunini and was built from 1917 to 1925 by a company of Genoa named Officine Elettriche Genovesi. There were two dams, the higher of 45 metres (bric Zerbino dam) and another one of 15 metres (Diga della Sella Zerbino). After a period of heavy rains of August 1935 the sella Zerbino dam crashed, generating a flood of the Orba which caused 111 dathts, mainly in the Ovada area. Nowadays Ortiglieto lake is much smaller than in the past and there is only one dam.

References 

Reservoirs in Italy
Lakes of Liguria
Lakes of Piedmont
Lago di Ortiglieto
Lago di Ortiglieto